Fernando Armindo Lugo Méndez (born 30 May 1951) is a Paraguayan politician and laicized Catholic bishop who was President of Paraguay from 2008 to 2012. Previously he was a Roman Catholic priest and bishop, serving as Bishop of the Diocese of San Pedro from 1994 to 2005. He was elected as president in 2008, an election that ended 61 years of rule by the Colorado Party.

In 2012, he was removed from office through an impeachment process that neighboring countries deemed a coup d'état. He was elected to the Senate of Paraguay in the 2013 general election.

Early life
He received his basic education at a religious school in Encarnación, and sold snacks on the streets.

His family was not particularly religious; by his own account, he never saw his father set foot in a church. However, they were active in Colorado Party politics. His maternal uncle, Epifanio Méndez Fleitas, was a co-conspirator in the 1954 Paraguayan coup d'état that helped bring Alfredo Stroessner to power. However, he later fell out of favor with Stroessner and ultimately left the country. Fernando's father was imprisoned twenty times, and some of his elder siblings were sent into so-called exile.

Priesthood
His father wanted Lugo to become a lawyer, but at 18 Lugo entered a normal school, and began teaching in a rural community. He was well accepted by the community, which was very religious, but they had no priest. He said later that he was touched by that experience, and so discovered his vocation to the Roman Catholic priesthood. At age 19 he entered a seminary operated by the Society of the Divine Word. He was ordained a priest for the society on 15 August 1977. He was sent to Ecuador, where he served as a missionary for five years. In Ecuador he learned about liberation theology and taught classes at the Centro Biblio Verbo Divino in Quito.

Lugo returned to Paraguay in 1982, and after a year, was sent to Rome for further academic studies. Lugo came back to Paraguay in 1987, two years before the Stroessner dictatorship's fall. Lugo was ordained a bishop on 17 April 1994, and received charge of the nation's poorest diocese, in the San Pedro diocese.

Lugo resigned as ordinary of the Diocese of San Pedro on 11 January 2005. He had requested laicization to run for office. However, the Holy See refused the request on the grounds that bishops could not undergo laicization, and also denied him the requested canonical permission to run for civil elected office. However, after Lugo won the presidential election, the Church granted his laicization on 30 June 2008.

Political career

Lugo jumped to the national arena by backing peasant claims for better land distribution. During 2006, opinion polls published by Diario ABC Color newspaper showed him as a possible choice for the opposition's presidential candidacy. Known as "the bishop of the poor", Lugo was seen in subsequent months as the most serious threat to the dominance of the Colorado Party on Paraguayan politics. Although he said he found the presidency of Hugo Chávez in Venezuela interesting, he made a point to distance himself from leftist leaders in Latin America, focusing more on social inequality in Paraguay.
On 23 February 2007, a Prensa Latina article noted that the Paraguayan Interior Ministry offered Lugo protection because of the death threats he received during the course of his political activities.

Presidential candidacy

According to a poll in February 2007, he was the leading contender in the April 2008 presidential election, with more than 37% of the voters' intention. On 29 October 2007, he registered as member of the small Christian Democratic Party of Paraguay (CDP), which allowed him to file as a candidate.

The CDP became the core of the Patriotic Alliance for Change, a coalition of more than a dozen opposition parties and social movements which backed Lugo for President. Federico Franco of the Authentic Radical Liberal Party, Paraguay's largest opposition party, was the candidate for Vice President.

The legality of Lugo's candidacy was questioned, because Article 235 of the Constitution forbids clerics of any religious denomination to hold elective office, and Pope Benedict XVI had rejected Lugo's resignation from the priesthood.
However, on 16 November 2007, President Nicanor Duarte Frutos (also Chairman of the Colorado Party) announced that the Party would not object to Lugo's candidacy, In July 2008, the Pope laicized Lugo, which made the question moot.

President

On 20 April 2008, Lugo won the election by a margin of 10%, gaining a 42.3% vote share. The Colorado Party candidate, Blanca Ovelar, acknowledged that Lugo had an unassailable lead and conceded the race that same night at about 9 pm local time. Two hours later, President Duarte acknowledged that the Colorados had lost an election for the first time in 61 years. Lugo's swearing in marked the first time in Paraguay's history (the country gained independence in 1811) that a ruling party peacefully surrendered power to an elected member from the opposition. He became Paraguay's second leftist president (the first being Rafael Franco, who served from 1936 to 1937), and the first to be freely elected.

Lugo was sworn in as President on 15 August 2008, saying he would not accept the presidential salary because it "belongs to more humble people" and encouraged other politicians to refuse their salaries as well.

He initially named Alejandro Hamed as his foreign minister. During the campaign, Lugo had suggested that he would switch diplomatic relations from the Republic of China (Taiwan) to the People's Republic of China, thereby depriving the ROC of its last diplomatic ally in South America. However, after the inauguration, which had been attended by President Ma Ying-jeou from Taiwan, Lugo stated that he had no plans to switch recognition.

On 18 August 2008, Lugo named Margarita Mbywangi, a member of the Aché indigenous ethnic group, as secretary of indigenous affairs, the first indigenous person to hold such a position in Paraguay.

Two of the main promises of Lugo's presidential campaign were tackling corruption and encouraging land reform. A number of initiatives were introduced to improve the lives of Paraguay's poor, such as investments in low-income housing, the introduction of free treatment in public hospitals, and the introduction of cash transfers for Paraguay's most impoverished citizens.

Cabinet
 Minister of Foreign Relations: Alejandro Hamed Franco, Hector Lacognata and Jorge Lara Castro
 Minister of Finance: Dionisio Cornelio Borda
 Minister of Internal Affairs: Rafael Filizzola (PDP)
 Minister of National Defence: Luis Bareiro Spaini, Cecilio Pérez Bordón and Catalino Luis Roy
 Minister of Agriculture and Livestock: Cándido Vera Bejarano (PLRA) and Enzo Cardozo
 Minister of Industry and Commerce: Martín Heisecke (PLRA)
 Minister of Justice and Labor: Blas Llano (PLRA) and Humberto Blasco
 Minister of Public Works and Communications: Efraín Alegre (PLRA) and Cecilio Pérez Bordón
 Minister of Public Health and Social Welfare: Esperanza Martínez (Frente Guasú)
 Minister of Education and Culture: Horacio Galeano Perrone (ANR), Luis Riart (PLRA) and Víctor Ríos
 Minister of Women: Gloria Godoy de Rubin
 General Secretary of the Presidency: Miguel Ángel López Perito 
 Secretary of Public Function: Lilian Soto (Kuña Pyrenda) and José Tomás Sánchez 
 Secretary of Technical Planification: Carlos Sánchez y Bernardo Esquivel Vasken
 Secretary of the Environment: José Luis Casaccia (ANR) 
 Secretary of Social Action: Paulino Cáceres (Tekojoja)
 Secretary of Culture: Ticio Escobar
 Secretary of National Emergency: Camilo Soares (P-MAS) and Gladys Mercedes Cardozo Zacarías
 Secretary of Childhood and Adolescence: Liz Torres
 Anti-drugs National Secretary: César Damián Aquino
 Director of the National Indigenous Institute: Margarita Mbywangi (Tekojoja)

Impeachment

On 15 June 2012, seventeen people were killed in a clash between landless farmers and the police who were trying to evict them; some sources consider that all this was taken as a pretext to expel Lugo. The Chamber of Deputies cited this event as well as insecurity, nepotism and a controversial land purchase to vote 76 to 1 to impeach Lugo on 21 June 2012. The Senate took up the case the next day. The impeachment was attended by a delegation of Foreign Affairs ministers from the other nations of the Union of South American Nations. The vote ended with 39 votes for Lugo's removal and four for his continuity, which ended his mandate and turned Federico Franco into the new president of Paraguay. Lugo announced that he would denounce the case to the Inter-American Court of Human Rights, stating that the time to prepare a legal defence, just two hours, may be unconstitutional. The removal of Lugo was followed by demonstrations by his supporters.

The presidents of Paraguay's neighbouring countries rejected Lugo's removal from office, and compared it to a coup d'état. Brazilian president Dilma Rousseff proposed suspending Paraguay's membership in Mercosur and the Union of South American Nations. Cristina Fernández de Kirchner of Argentina, Rafael Correa of Ecuador and Leonel Fernández of the Dominican Republic announced that they would not recognize Franco as president. Condemnation also came from more conservative governments in the region, such as Colombia and Chile. Lugo's removal has drawn comparisons to the ouster of Honduras' Manuel Zelaya in 2009; like the ouster of Lugo it was defended as legal and constitutional by its supporters while being denounced as a coup across the Latin American political spectrum.

Lugo himself accepted his ouster, saying that any legal and realistic chance of reinstating him ended when the Supreme Court of Paraguay declared his impeachment and confirmed his removal, and the electoral court recognized Franco as the new president.  However, he denounced it as "a congressional coup."

He is considered in the polls as the best president in the contemporary history of Paraguay.

Senatorial candidacy
In the 2013 election to replace his interim presidential replacement Lugo ran as a senate candidate. He was elected as member of Paraguayan Senate representing left-wing coalition Frente Guasú.

Honors
Lugo was awarded the Order of Brilliant Jade by Ma Ying-jeou, the President of the Republic of China in March 2011.

Personal life
As Lugo was unmarried during his presidency, he designated his elder sister, Mercedes Lugo, as First Lady of Paraguay.

In August 2010, Lugo was diagnosed with non-Hodgkin lymphoma. He continued his duties as president of Paraguay while undergoing treatment.

He also studied at Pontifical Gregorian University in Rome.

Children
Lugo fathered several children out of wedlock including one that was allegedly the result of sexual assault. These allegations from four mothers, who claimed that Lugo had fathered their children while under a vow of celibacy, emerged soon after his 2008 inauguration. One of the children was conceived with a 24-year-old woman who says they began a sexual relationship when she was sixteen (Paraguay's age of consent is 14) and while he was a bishop.

References

External links

 Fernando Lugo profile at CatholicHierarchy website
 27 February 2007 New York Times article on Lugo's possible candidacy
 22 February 2007 article on Lugo from Worldpress.org
 30 December 2006 Daily (Maybe) blog on background to Lugo's presidential bid
 Lugo Wins Election at AP
 18 April 2008 article on Lugo and Paraguay elections from The Christian Science Monitor
 "Rise of the Red Bishop", The Guardian Weekly, 14 August 2008
Biography by CIDOB

|-

|-

 
1951 births
20th-century Roman Catholic bishops in Paraguay
21st-century Roman Catholic bishops in Paraguay
Impeached presidents removed from office
Laicized Roman Catholic bishops
Living people
Paraguayan Christian socialists
Paraguayan sociologists
People from Itapúa Department
People from San Pedro Department, Paraguay
Presidents of Paraguay
Presidents of the Senate of Paraguay
Presidents pro tempore of the Union of South American Nations
Universidad Católica Nuestra Señora de la Asunción alumni
Catholic socialists
Roman Catholic bishops of San Pedro